Linton Hall School is a Catholic coeducational day-school occupying a 120‑acre campus in Bristow, Virginia, in Prince William County about  west of Washington, D.C. It is located within the Roman Catholic Diocese of Arlington.

History

Early history
Linton Hall School (formerly Linton Hall Military School) is located in Bristow, Virginia (Prince William County, Virginia,) on a portion of the 1,700 acres of land originally donated for the education of poor boys and girls by Sarah Elliot Linton (born 1822, died 1891,) who took the name of Sister Baptista upon becoming a Benedictine nun at age 22. Sarah Linton had previously inherited the land from her father, John Tyler Linton, who had died just two months before Sarah's birth. 
The Benedictine Fathers established St. Maurus Boys' School in 1893; the Benedictine Sisters established St. Edith's Academy for girls in 1894. St. Edith's opened with sixteen boarders and several day students.[1] After World War I, the enrollment of both schools began to decline. The Benedictine Fathers returned to their abbey in Belmont, North Carolina. In 1922, the Benedictine Sisters founded St. Gertrude High School for girls in Richmond, Virginia. The same year, St. Edith's, in Bristow, was converted to Linton Hall Military School, a military boarding school for boys ages 6–16.

Linton Hall Military School
Linton Hall began as a military school; however, the military program was discontinued for a few years. In 1932, the military program was re-established. As enrollment increased, the monastery building lacked adequate space for housing the academic and residential programs. In 1940, two floors of St. Ann's Guest House were converted into dorms. In 1946, the first floor of the main portion of the present building was completed and served as a residence hall for all the students. By 1951, the second and third floors and the classroom wing were completed. Physical education facilities included a gymnasium built in 1956, an outdoor swimming pool constructed in 1968, tennis courts, the Welker Memorial playground, various playing fields, and a playground purchased by the Parent School Guild.

Daily life
During the 1940s, students were permitted one designated weekend per month "provided scholastic standing and conduct warrant it." 
John Phillips (musician), who attended Linton Hall Military School from 1942 to 1946, and later gained fame as singer, songwriter and guitarist for The Mamas & the Papas, recalls in his autobiography that he "hated the place," even though he earned good grades, made many friends, and played sports. He writes of "the inspections and the beatings" and recalls that "nuns used to watch us take showers."
Students followed a strict schedule, particularly on weekdays, from rising at 6:45 a.m. to their 9:00 p.m. bedtime, with only 45 minutes of free play allocated on Mondays and Wednesdays, and two hours on Tuesdays, Thursdays, and Fridays, plus some time in the evening during 'rest' period in the dormitories. Cadets were not permitted to keep items such as food, money, or comic books, nor make or receive telephone calls, except in case of emergency.
After the new building was completed in the late 1940s, cadets were housed in dormitories, each of which contained approximately fifty beds, set in three rows, each bed separated from the next by a folding metal chair approximately 18 inches wide. There were no curtains on the windows and walls were bereft of any decoration, such as pictures or posters.

Foreign students
In 1951, students from Latin America, predominantly Mexico, began to enroll at Linton Hall.  Over the years, the number of foreign students increased, until foreign students constituted a sizeable portion of the student body. This opportunity for cultural exchange provided an added dimension to the program.

Boards
The Linton Hall Board of Visitors was founded in 1974 in order to assist the administration in forming policies concerning future growth, development, finances, public relations, and other areas of concern. The Board of Visitors was dissolved in 1991, giving way to the advisory board.
In the 1975–1976 school year, a five-day resident program was offered to make the boarding facility available to more students. In addition to maintaining accreditation by the Virginia State Board of Education and membership in the National Catholic Education Association (NCEA), Linton Hall became a member of the Virginia Association of Independent Schools (VAIS) in 1977.

Summer activities
For thirty-nine years Linton Hall operated a summer camp program which provided a variety of activities as well as summer classes. Beginning in 1990, Linton Hall focused on a day camp which served many of the children from the Extended Day Program. The summer camp of 1993 began a special inclusion of underprivileged children from the local community. The camp under the sponsorship of the Benedictine Sisters of Virginia ended in the summer of 1996. Since that time the facilities and grounds have been rented to other sports organizations for their use. Swimming lessons and a technology-based program are still provided by Linton Hall.

End of military program
By the 1978–1979 academic year, the school had dropped the word 'military' from its name, even though the military program still existed.  During the early 1980s, as enrollment continued to decline, the Benedictine Sisters were rethinking the role of Linton Hall as a military school.  A consultant was hired in 1987 to direct an in-depth study of direction for change. Demographic studies showed the promise of growth and development in Prince William County. A series of meetings and studies among the Benedictine Sisters resulted in a decision to discontinue the military program.

Current
In 1988, Linton Hall School became a coeducational day school, for students from kindergarten through eighth grade, and maintained its Catholic identity. The military program was discontinued, and the residential program was phased out gradually.  Most of the land was sold to developers, with the school retaining 120 acres.  Enrollment during the 1988–1989 school year was 33 students. Beginning with the 1989–1990 school year enrollment has steadily increased. With the addition of a pre-kindergarten in 2004 and Little Sprouts (preschool 2, 3, 4 and bridge) in 2013, enrollment reached 300 students.

References

Further reading
 Cadet, Linton Hall, Linton Hall Military School Memories: One cadet's memoir, Scrounge Press, 2014.    Memoir of cadet who attended during the late 1960s, with copies of brochures from the 1940s and 1980s, and photos of the school.
 Cho, Augustus, Great Light Will Shine III: Linton Hall Military School, Lulu Press, 2010.   Memoir of author's immigration from South Korea and initial experiences at LHMS in 1968.

External links
 
 
 

Educational institutions established in 1894
Schools in Prince William County, Virginia
Private middle schools in Virginia
Private elementary schools in Virginia
Private K–8 schools in the United States
1894 establishments in Virginia
Catholic schools in Virginia